Samuel Beatty (December 16, 1820 – May 26, 1885) was an American soldier, sheriff, and farmer from Ohio. He was a brigadier general in the Union Army during the American Civil War. In 1866, he was awarded the brevet grade of major general of volunteers.

Early life and career
Beatty was born in Mifflin County, Pennsylvania, but was raised in Stark County, Ohio. He served as a lieutenant in the Third Ohio Infantry during the Mexican–American War in the 1840s, and then was the sheriff of Stark County in the late 1850s.

Civil War service
When the Civil War erupted, he formed a volunteer unit that mustered in as Company A of the 19th Ohio Infantry—the "Canton Light Guards." Beatty was elected as the regiment's first colonel. After initial organization and training at the local fairgrounds, the regiment was transported to Camp Chase in Columbus, Ohio, for additional drilling. Beatty led the 19th Ohio in a series of battles in western Virginia, including the Battle of Rich Mountain. He fought at the Battle of Shiloh in the spring of 1862. He subsequently commanded a brigade (11th Brigade, Fifth Division, II Corps) in the Army of the Cumberland at the Battle of Perryville in Kentucky that autumn.

Beatty, although still a colonel in rank, took command of Brig. Gen. Horatio Van Cleve's division of Maj. Gen. Thomas L. Crittenden's wing during the Battle of Stones River after the general was wounded. His men were driven back by a charge by Confederates under John C. Breckinridge. They rallied after federal artillery gathered by Crittenden's artillery chief, Captain John Mendenhall, bombarded Breckinridge's troops.

Promoted to brigadier general backdated to November 1862, Beatty's personal bravery at the Battle of Chickamauga in September 1863 received the commendation of XXI Corps commander Thomas L. Crittenden, who wrote, "With pride I mention the name of Brig. Gen. Samuel Beatty for his conduct on this occasion."

Beatty led a brigade in the IV Corps of the Army of the Cumberland during the Atlanta Campaign.

By nomination of President Andrew Johnson on January 13, 1866 and confirmation by the U.S. Senate on March 12, 1866, he was retroactively awarded the brevet grade of major general of volunteers, to rank from March 13, 1865, for his actions at the Battle of Nashville, leading the division of Brig. Gen. Thomas J. Wood, who was acting corps commander. This brevet promotion made him the highest ranking Union Army officer from Stark County.

Beatty was mustered out of the volunteer service on January 15, 1866.

Postbellum career
After the war, Beatty returned to Stark County and farmed in Jackson Township. He died at home and was buried in the City Cemetery in Massillon, Ohio.

Original farmhouse located at 8903 Beatty ST NW MASSILLON, OH 44646. Later deconstructed and put into storage.

See also

 List of American Civil War generals (Union)
 List of Ohio's American Civil War generals
 Ohio in the American Civil War

Notes

References
 Eicher, John H., and David J. Eicher, Civil War High Commands. Stanford: Stanford University Press, 2001. .
 Reid, Whitelaw, Ohio in the War: Her Statesmen, Her Generals, and Soldiers. Volume 2. Cincinnati: Moore, Wilstach, & Baldwin, 1868.
 U.S. War Department, The War of the Rebellion: A Compilation of the Official Records of the Union and Confederate Armies, 70 volumes in 4 series. Washington, D.C.: United States Government Printing Office, 1880–1901.

External links
 National Park Service - Battle of Stones River
 

Union Army generals
People of Ohio in the American Civil War
People from Stark County, Ohio
People from Mifflin County, Pennsylvania
American military personnel of the Mexican–American War
1885 deaths
1820 births
Military personnel from Pennsylvania